Mark Jackson is a drummer, electronic percussionist, and keyboard player, formerly a member of futurepop act VNV Nation. He is also an established professional club DJ and remix artist. In November 2017, it was announced that he was leaving VNV Nation to pursue other projects.

In addition to his work with VNV Nation, Mark has been involved in numerous artistic collaborations with other musicians and producers in the electronic music scenes.  Notably including vocal work with Rotersand, Reaper, Oliver Huntemann, and The Parallel Project, as well as live work and guest appearances with acts including Combichrist, Straftanz, Apoptygma Berzerk, and Kloq.

Mark originates from Essex, England and worked as a software developer, internet programmer, and web designer for CompuServe, MSN, and Microsoft. He played drums and keyboards as part of the electronic duo Manzero (1991–1993) and was vocalist and frontman for Faith Regime (1993–1995) before becoming a full-time musician with VNV Nation in 1996. He now lives in southwest France in the Basque Country region.

A hobby of his is raising tarantulas.

External links 
 Official VNV Nation website
 VNV Nation Gallery with Mark Jackson – 2007

Living people
English drummers
British male drummers
Musicians from Essex
1970 births
21st-century drummers
21st-century British male musicians